John Ollis (March 23, 1839 – November 16, 1913) was an American farmer, lawyer, and politician.

Born in Bergen, Norway, Ollis emigrated with his parents to the United States in 1849 and settled in the town of Vienna, Dane County, Wisconsin. Ollis went the public schools and to University of Wisconsin and Luther College in Decorah, Iowa.. Ollis was a farmer. He served on the Vienna Town Board and was chairman of the town board. He also served as the Vienna Town Assessor. In 1878, Ollis served in the Wisconsin State Assembly and was a Republican. In 1884, Ollis graduated from the University of Wisconsin Law School and practiced law in Madison, Wisconsin. He died at his home in Madison, Wisconsin.

References

1839 births
1913 deaths
Norwegian emigrants to the United States
Politicians from Bergen
Politicians from Madison, Wisconsin
Luther College (Iowa) alumni
University of Wisconsin–Madison alumni
University of Wisconsin Law School alumni
Farmers from Wisconsin
Wisconsin lawyers
Mayors of places in Wisconsin
Wisconsin city council members
Members of the Wisconsin State Assembly
19th-century American politicians
Lawyers from Madison, Wisconsin
People from Vienna, Wisconsin
19th-century American lawyers